Al-Shams Fi Yawm Gha'em is a 1986 Syrian language film release directed by the Syrian film Director Muhammad Shahin of 90 minutes duration.

Plot 
This film is set in 1930s Syria's pre-independence days. Adil (Jihad Sahd) was born into wealth yet empathizes with the poor, renounces his family and joins the "lower orders." He is given a crash course in Syrian customs by the Old Man (Rafik El Soubeil). Adil is awakened sexually by the ingratiating prostitute (Muna Wassef). Adil's father finds his son, is envious of the Old Man's relationship with the boy and he exacts a terrible revenge on the old man by using his money and social position as protection from legal consequences.

Cast 
 Muna Wassef - the "Prostitute"
 Rafik El Soubeil - Old Man
 Jihad Sahd - Adil
 Jada El Charnaa - Nour

References

External links 
 Sun on a hazy Day at Yahoo! Movies
 

1986 films
Syrian drama films
Films directed by Muhammad Shahin
1980s Arabic-language films